"The Letter" is the 38th episode of the sitcom Seinfeld. The episode was the 21st of the third season. It aired on March 25, 1992.

Plot
Kramer poses for a portrait to be painted by Jerry's new girlfriend, Nina (Catherine Keener), which an elderly, art-loving couple (Elliott Reid and Justine Johnston) admire. George feels obligated to buy something when he accompanies Jerry to Nina's art studio, especially when she offers George her father's tickets to the owner's box at Yankee Stadium. George then reluctantly purchases a $500 painting, which he tries to sell to Jerry for $10 at the end of the episode.

With Nina's tickets, George brings both Elaine and Kramer to the owner's box at Yankee Stadium. In order to get out of a prior engagement (her boss's son's bris), Elaine lies to her boss, Mr. Lippman, saying she must tend to her ill father. However, once the three are seated in the box, Elaine refuses to remove her Baltimore Orioles baseball cap and they are consequently ejected. Kramer, while attempting to climb over the dugout to retrieve George’s Yankee cap after Elaine threw it, is struck in the head by a baseball. At the same time, Nina and Jerry have an argument and break up.

Upon returning to Jerry's apartment, Elaine discovers her confrontation in the Yankees' owners box was published with a picture in the sports section of the paper. After an unsuccessful attempt at stealing the sports section of the paper from her boss' office desk, Elaine fears her boss will recognize her picture and her lie about her father. Meanwhile, a poetic and emotional letter is delivered to Jerry's from Nina. Although he is initially moved and humbled, Jerry soon finds out that the letter was plagiarized from the Neil Simon film Chapter Two. While Jerry reinstates his breakup with Nina, the elderly couple who admired Kramer's portrait walk in to confirm their purchase.

Elaine is summoned to her boss's office, whose accountant is revealed to be Nina's father. As he recites the baseball cap story over the phone, Lippman is amused and apparently does not realize that the offender was Elaine. He informs her that Nina's father has given him tickets to Yankee Stadium and invites her to wear a Baltimore cap (which she coincidentally has in her office) as a joke.

In the closing scene, Jerry and George watch the televised Yankees game, only to find Elaine in yet another cap altercation as described by Phil Rizzuto and Kramer dines with the elderly couple who purchased his portrait.

Popularity
Both the oil painting of Kramer and the words the elderly couple use to describe it became popular among Seinfeld fans. Rob Thomas of the Wisconsin State Journal included the line "he is a loathsome, offensive brute, yet I can't look away" in his top 20 of Seinfeld lines.

References

External links
 

Seinfeld (season 3) episodes
1992 American television episodes
Television episodes written by Larry David